Last Dinosaurs are an Australian indie rock band from Brisbane, Queensland, Australia who formed in 2007. They band consists of Sean Caskey (Lead/Backup Vocals, Rhythm/Lead guitar), Lachlan Caskey (Lead/Backup vocals, Lead/Rhythm guitar), Danjuro Koyama (Drums) and Michael Sloane (Bass). Koyama and the Caskey brothers are all of Japanese descent, and the band have toured and frequently make visits to Japan. The band formed with Sean and Dan upon meeting each other during High School and realising they had an equal passion for music they first formed a band called "The Cairos" (who included Alistar Richardson/Zefereli, who was their touring drummer during 2011/2012) before writing music for Last Dinosaurs. Later on Lachlan and Sam Gethin-Jones joined, their bassist who stayed until 2013, who was replaced by Michael Sloane.

The band's debut EP Back From The Dead in 2010 and subsequent debut studio album In a Million Years in 2012 received critical praise by Australian media critics including the likes of Triple J, among others. The band is currently signed in Australia to independent label Dew Process, and in the UK are signed to Fiction Records. Internationally, Last Dinosaurs distributes through Universal Music Group.

On 28 August 2015, Last Dinosaurs released their second album Wellness. The album's release was preceded by singles "Evie" and "Apollo".

On 5 October 2018, the band released their third album, titled Yumeno Garden following their 2 singles released that year, "Dominos" and "Eleven". The band wanted to step away from big budget production because they felt they were mature enough to be responsible for their own music, even admitting there were things about their previous works that they wished had done differently, or continued doing contrary to what eventually got released. "Yumeno Garden" sees the band almost entirely be self produced, with perhaps a small bit of help. The first half of the album belongs to Sean, while the second belongs to Lachlan, each singing their own tracks. Lachlan's half realises old songs that he has uploaded to SoundCloud under his alias "Notes From Under Ground", giving them refined sounds and vocals, or even completely different arrangements.

In 2019 and 2020 the band released 2 standalone singles, "FMU" and "Flying" respectively, who are self produced with the help of other producers such as Jean Paul-Fung, who produced their debut album. "Flying" sees the band enter a new style of genre, 'nu-disco' after the Lachlan, the band and Jean all decided that the song would turn a different direction than it's SoundCloud demo.

On 4 November 2022, they released their fourth album titled "From Mexico With Love", which is also self produced but with the help of producer James Angus. The album followed after 6 singles released periodically throughout 2022 by the label, starting with "Collect Call", followed by Look Back, "CDMX", "The Hating", "Auto-Sabotage", and finally "Put Up With The Weather!". This album was completely written by Lachlan in Mexico during 2020 in the height of the world pandemic, while the other members were separated from each other in Australia. This album sees a completely new direction, as Lachlan sings on 99% of the entire track-list, also the album contains many genres, not afraid to give the band more and more different sounds to their discography.

The band is named after the song "Last Dinosaur" by the Japanese rock band The Pillows.

History

Formation and Early Days (2007–2009)
In 2007, frontman Sean Caskey and drummer Dan Koyama met during high school and developed a strong interest in music. Soon afterward, Sean's younger brother Lachlan joined the band as lead guitarist. Sam Gethin-Jones, who was already a talented drummer in the Brisbane music scene, tried his hand at bass and completed the original Last Dinosaurs quartet. Prior to Sam leaving the band in 2013, the Last Dinosaurs were 3/8 Japanese and 1/4 Jewish.

Early Success and "Back From The Dead" (2009–2010)
After launching their debut extended-play in 2010, the band first found success after posting their demo to the Triple J Unearthed project. Not long after, they were interviewed by radio DJ Zan Rowe. Hit track "Honolulu" from Back from the Dead was placed on high rotation on national broadcaster Triple J, quickly gaining the band recognition in the music community. With their name popping up in music publications, blogs, and gaining fans through the airing of their songs on Triple J, the band was invited to play at mainstream music festivals including Splendour in the Grass, the Laneway Festival, the Falls Festival and Southbound, and have supported bands such as Foals, Matt & Kim, Lost Valentinos and Foster the People.

"In a Million Years" (2011–2012)
In early 2011 the band announced that they had been planning on recording their debut album after their "Back from the Dead" tour in mid-2010. In June 2011 the band started a Tumblr blog narrating their recording process for the album with producer Jean-Paul Fung at BJB Studios in Sydney, Australia. The album entitled as In a Million Years was released on 2 March 2012. The album made an Australian Top 10 Debut and managed to get to number 8 on the Australian Albums Chart and number 2 on the digital album charts. The band completed the sold out Million Years national tour, with multiple shows in many cities due to ticket demand. The band then completed a tour of the UK and Europe, and later released the album in the UK in September 2012.

"Wellness" (2013–2015)
After the release of their debut album in 2012, Last Dinosaurs experienced a number of changes that have not affected the band in any significant way. Despite these changes however, various new opportunities for the band arose through 2013 and 2014, and Last Dinosaurs continued with plans to release a follow-up album to In a Million Years.

On 23 July 2013, Sam Gethin-Jones posted a statement on the band's Facebook page formally announcing that he was leaving the band. "For the band to move forward in the strongest way possible it is best that we part ways now," he said. Although he did not give a clear explanation as to why he was leaving, he ensured fans that he wasn't leaving music altogether, and his departure was the start of a "different pathway [for him] to follow." He thanked fans, and assured that there was no bad blood between the four.

On 13 October 2013, Last Dinosaurs officially announced through Twitter that the band had begun writing their second album.

As a result of Gethin-Jones' departure from Last Dinosaurs, the band had lost its bass guitarist, leaving a major gap in the quartet's line-up. Beginning with Last Dinosaurs' South African tour in September 2013, Michael Sloane toured with the band substituting as bass player and providing backing vocals. A friend of the band, Sloane was the band's original bassist and had previously worked with the band numerous times directing the music videos for "Zoom", "Time and Place", and "Andy". On 28 January 2014, Last Dinosaurs officially announced that after four months of being with the band, Michael had officially returned and joined on as bassist.

After a several months-long break from touring internationally through South Africa and Asia, Last Dinosaurs completed writing for their next album and were finally ready to record. In late November and early December 2014, Last Dinosaurs announced via Facebook and Twitter that the band was set to commence recording of their unnamed new album on 3 December 2014. As of 20 March 2015, Last Dinosaurs were working on Wellness at The Grove Studios near Gosford, New South Wales. The band posted photos and updates to social media and their website through the production process.

In response to a question via Twitter, Last Dinosaurs' manager noted on 7 April 2015 that the band's first single from their upcoming album would be tentatively released in about five weeks; indicating a May 2015 release.

On 1 May 2015, Last Dinosaurs released "Evie", the first single from their upcoming second album Wellness. "Evie" was premiered by Linda Marigliano on Triple J's "Good Nights" program on 30 April 2015.

The second single "Apollo" was also premiered by Marigliano on Triple J's Good Nights program on 15 July 2015 along with the announcement of Last Dinosaurs' second album Wellness.

Wellness was released internationally on 28 August 2015. The album features all new songs except "Zero" and "Stream" which the band debuted live while touring in 2013. Wellness debuted at number 18 in the Australian ARIA Charts, ten spots lower than In a Million Years reached.

Last Dinosaurs then went on their Wellness tour, their first show being on 15 September 2015, and their final one being on 18 October 2015. They showcased their songs in the Wellness album on the tour.

The Last Dinosaurs also went on the Australia-exclusive tour, Miracle Methods. The tour brought them to Adelaide, Brisbane, Melbourne, and Sydney.

"Yumeno Garden" (2018–2019)
On 20 February 2018, Last Dinosaurs Released their first new single accompanied by 2 music videos, "Dominos", was the beginning of their new era. The videos were footage of the band playing the song live at their release party for the single, and the other being the official music video for Dominos. They later released "Eleven" alongside "Dominos", on 4 July 2018. Soon after, a music video for "Eleven" was uploaded on 30 July 2018.

On 5 October 2018, the band's third album, Yumeno Garden, was released, having been preceded by the singles "Dominos" and "Eleven". There was an album launch party held that night, where Last Dinosaurs showcased their brand new album. This third album was the band's first ever full creation that was entirely do-it-yourself, as they took it upon themselves to write, mix, and produce the songs single-handedly.

On 24 April 2019, Last Dinosaurs announced a European tour, playing them in late November. Shortly after completing their first USA tour in the spring, they announced that they would be returning to more U.S. cities in October/November 2019.

Standalone Singles (2019-2020) 
On 30 September 2019, Last Dinosaurs released a new single titled "FMU" just before they left to embark on their lengthy US/EU tour. This song was premiered on Triple J's "Good Nights" show, with Ebony Boadu. It has been spoken of several times in interviews that the meaning of the song's lyrics relates back to the tense relationship between Hong Kong and China.

On 17 April 2020, the band released another single titled "Flying" that had originally been a demo on Lachlan's SoundCloud. The song is a departure from their usual indie rock catalogue and gears more towards house music and nu-disco. The band announced through Instagram the following year that their fourth album had been completed.

"From Mexico With Love" (2022) 
On 11 February 2022 the band released another single titled "Collect Call". Later, they released the single "Look Back" on 25 March. On 5 May, another single was released called "CDMX". On 26 May, the band then announced their upcoming album From Mexico With Love, set for release 4 November. After the announcement, the band released 3 more singles before the release, "The Hating" on 23 June, "Auto-Sabotage" on 4 August, and "Put Up With The Weather!" on 15 September.

Regarding the album, In a press statement, guitarist and co-lead vocalist Lachlan Caskey stated that the album was written amidst the COVID-19 pandemic, while quarantining in Mexico. "Mexico was more than just a place to quarantine", states Caskey. "It was an inspiration as complex as the album itself". The effort was co-produced by the band and James Agnus once Caskey returned to Australia, and is their first album to feature the latter as the sole lead vocalist.

When Australia closed its borders due to COVID, Lachlan found himself stuck in Canada before making his way to Mexico to work on the album in creative solitude. Sometimes magic comes from chaos as Lachlan found a wellspring of creativity and as soon as Australia opened, Lachlan took his raw material back home to the band to produce From Mexico with Love. While the writing was a solo act, the band agrees that it's the final touches that are so important to the sound. That's where the collaboration with Sean, lead guitarist, and Sloane, on bass comes in. The melodies are funky and upbeat. Electric guitar riffs paired with smooth vocals, feel simple and happy: the kind of music you want to roller skate under a disco ball to. But the lyrics are anything but simple.

The result is an electric testimony to the DIY tradition that investigates the places we go not just externally but internally. Inside that, landscapes spanning gratitude within the exhaustion of touring in the first track, "Hanson's Ghost," to the feeling of leaving behind a familiar life in "Look Back." He speaks of taking risks for love in "Put Up with the Weather!" With "Collect Call," Lachlan muses on forgotten dreams and letting go against an impossibly catchy melody. Thankfully for us, Mexico was more than just a place to quarantine. It was an inspiration as complex as the album itself, a fact that's honoured in the album title and the song "CDMX."

"In Mexico, I had a lot of time to think about life, to face the demons and just figure s out. But there were also rapturous moments where I felt so free," says Lachlan of the writing process. Considering this, it's not surprising that woven into the flowing and sunny songs are real messages about self-work and growth. Songs like "Auto-Sabotage" and "Note to Self" deal with the reality that sometimes we're the ones getting in our own way. In "Can't Afford Psychoanalysis," Lachlan ironically sings 'I think I might require psychoanalysis.' (Something that he would probably recommend to the posers he sings about in "The Hating.") In "When Pigs Fly," the ending track, deep feelings of doubt and pessimism float over a bright and airy melody.

While it may seem counterintuitive to pair such intense sentiments to upbeat "Japanese city pop" inspired melodies, that paradoxical nature is part of their musical DNA. Half Japanese, the Caskey brothers attribute it to their upbringing watching Studio Ghibli films. "They border on heart-breaking but the music is sweet," says Sean," That's where I got my melodic sense. I think melancholy is a big part of Japanese culture." To Lachlan, it's the hidden nature of these messages that make them even more powerful: "Melancholy was what made us want to be musicians in the first place," says Lachlan, "The Strokes, The Beach Boys. It's the idea that someone who really listens would say it's a sad song, but a passive listener wouldn't get it."

Members
Current
 Sean Caskey – Lead/Backup Vocals, Rhythm/Lead Guitar (2007–Present)
 Lachlan Caskey – Backing/Lead Vocals, Lead/Rhythm Guitar (2007–Present)
 Michael Sloane – Bass (2007, 2013–Present)
 Dan Koyama – Drums (2007–Present)

Touring

 Alistar Richardson – Drums (2019)
 Finn Polbodetto – Drums (2022)
 Jasper Gundersen - Drums (2023)

Former
 Sam Gethin-Jones – Bass (2007–2013)

Discography

Studio albums

Extended Plays

Singles

Awards and nominations

APRA Awards
The APRA Awards are presented annually from 1982 by the Australasian Performing Right Association (APRA), "honouring composers and songwriters". They commenced in 1982.

! 
|-
| 2012 
| "Zoom" (Sean Caskey / Lachlan Caskey / Samuel Gethin-Jones / Dan Koyama)
| Song of the Year
| 
| 
|-

References

External links

Australian indie rock groups
Australian power pop groups
Australian synthpop groups
Dance-punk musical groups
Fiction Records artists
Dew Process artists
Musical groups established in 2007
Musical groups from Brisbane
Australian people of Japanese descent